Bilyayivka is a village in Beryslav Raion, Kherson Oblast, southern Ukraine, about  northeast from the centre of Kherson city.

History 
The village came under attack by Russian forces in 2022, during the Russian invasion of Ukraine, and was liberated by Ukrainian forces in the beginning of October.

Demographics
The settlement had 684 inhabitants in 2001. The native language distribution as of the Ukrainian Census of 2001:
Ukrainian: 97.00%
Russian: 3.00%

References

Villages in Beryslav Raion